1788 in sports describes the year's events in world sport.

Boxing
Events
 Tom Johnson retained his English championship but no fights involving him are recorded in 1788.
 31 December — "Big" Ben Brain defeated William Corbally  at Navestock in 20 minutes.

Cricket
Events
 Marylebone Cricket Club (MCC) published its version of the Laws of cricket, revising the Star and Garter Laws of 1774 
England
 Most runs – Billy Beldham 381
 Most wickets – David Harris 43

Horse racing
England
 The Derby – Sir Thomas
 The Oaks – Nightshade
 St Leger Stakes – Young Flora

References

 
1788